The New Gaol (also sometimes known as The Old City Gaol) is in Cumberland Road, Spike Island, Bristol, England, near Bristol Harbour.

History

The original New Gaol was designed by Henry Hake Seward and opened in 1820. In 1831, it was destroyed during the Bristol Riots and was rebuilt to designs by Richard Shackleton Pope, but was never properly completed until 1872. The gaol was closed in 1883 due to poor conditions and was largely demolished in 1898. In 1884, Horfield Prison was built to replace it.

In 1821, three days after his eighteenth birthday, John Horwood was the first person to be hanged at the Gaol for murdering Eliza Balsum by hurling a pebble at her which hit her on the right temple and she then tumbled into a brook.

English Heritage designated The Gaol entrance wall and gateway and the south-east perimeter wall as a Grade II listed building. It is now the centre-piece of a redevelopment project in this area of the city.

Archives
Papers related to the New Gaol (Ref. 17128) (online catalogue), and plans including Ref. 17567/5 (online catalogue) and 4312/76 (online catalogue) are held at Bristol Archives.

See also
 Grade II listed buildings in Bristol

References

Grade II listed buildings in Bristol
Government buildings completed in 1832
Infrastructure completed in 1832
Buildings and structures demolished in 1898
Bristol Harbourside
Prisons in Bristol
Demolished prisons
Defunct prisons in England